Blandevar  is a small village in the North Mazhuvannoor area of the Ernakulam district of India. The renowned Blandevar Mahavishnu Temple is located here.

The area is mainly agricultural with the main crops being rice, coconut, rubber and pineapple. Mazhuvannoor panchayathu and the village offices are situated at Irapuram.

Educational institutions 
 Govt UP School N. Mazhuvannoor
 Govt LP School Irapuram
 Sree Narayana Engineering college, Kadayirippu – 6 km
 MOSC medical college Kolenchery – 7 km
 Sree Sankara Arts college, Irapuram – 4 km
 Christknowledgecity engineering college  – 3 km
 C.E.T. College of Management, Science and Technology and International School  – 2 km
 Jai Bharath Group of Institutions  – 6 km

Cultural centers 
 Gramadeepam Library
 GDM arts and sports club
 Kilimugal arts and sports club
 New millennium arts and sports club, Double canal Jn.

Blandevar Mahavishnu Temple 

The yearly festival starts in the "atham" in the "kumbham" malayalan month. The six-day festival is celebrated by all the villagers without any caste difference. The name 'blandevar' is derived from an incident where the idol of the blandevar
temple was found from inside a Jackfruit tree (പ്ലാവ്).

Irapuram Bhagavathi Temple 

The Irapuram Bhagavathi Temple is an ancient temple which attracts many devotees in every year. The main festival is in the bharani day of the kumbham malayalan month. The main adoration here is Garudan Thookkam. Every year more than 250 garudan thookkam will be presented by devotees. The second main festival here is pathamudayam to celebrate the fight between Kali and Darikan in purana.

Kavipallathu Siva Temple 
The Kavipallathu Siva Temple is an ancient temple which has been recently renovated. This is the main siva temple in the North Mazhuvannoor area and is situated near to Kilikulam junction.

Mootherikkavu Bhagavathi Temple 
This temple is located in Thattamugal. The main festival is kalamezhuthum pattu and guruthi.

Thattamugal St. Mary's Jacobite Syrian Chappel 
St. Mary's Jacobite Syrian Chapel is the main Christian church in the North Mazhuvannoor area. It attracts many devotees every year. Feasts are celebrated without caste difference. The holy remains of St. Elias third highlights the blessings of place

Hospitals 

The nearest hospitals are the Government health center at Irapuram, the  MOSC medical college 7 km away and the Pazhanganadu Samarittan hospital which is 10 km away.

Nearest places 
The nearest railway stations are 25 km away at Aluva or 30 km away at Ernakulam. The nearest airport is Cochin Airport (Nedumbasserry) about 24 km away. Blandevar is 6 km from the Thiruvananthapuram – Angamaly state highway to the north and 6 km from the Ernakulam – Madurai national highway to the south.

The nearest villages are:
 Ernakulam         30 km
 Aluva             25 km
 Perumbavoor       12 km
 Muvattupuzha      10 km
 Kolenchery       7 km
 Valayanchirangara 4 km

References

External links 

Blandevar satellite picture
Kilikulam
Rubber Park Issue

Villages in Ernakulam district